Aetaella is a genus of praying mantids, in the family Leptomantellidae.  It has previously been placed as a subgenus of Leptomantella (i.e. as Leptomantis [Aetaella]) and species in this group have been recorded from Asia; especially Borneo.

Species 
The Mantodea Species File lists:
 Aetaella bakeri Hebard, 1920 - type species
 Aetaella pluvisilvae Henry, 1931

References

External Links 

Mantodea genera